Benney is a surname. Notable people with the surname include:

David Benney (1930–2015), New Zealand applied mathematician
Gerald Benney (1930–2008), British silver and goldsmith
Matt Benney (1902–1980), New Zealand civil servant and politician
Paul Benney (born 1959), British artist